Bridge in Franklin Township is a historic arch bridge located at Franklin Township in Greene County, Pennsylvania. It crosses Ten Mile Creek.

It was listed on the National Register of Historic Places in 1988.

References 

Road bridges on the National Register of Historic Places in Pennsylvania
Bridges completed in 1920
Bridges in Greene County, Pennsylvania
National Register of Historic Places in Greene County, Pennsylvania
Concrete bridges in the United States
Open-spandrel deck arch bridges in the United States
1920 establishments in Pennsylvania